Joe Samuel Hendry (born 1 May 1988) is a Scottish amateur and professional wrestler, currently signed to Impact Wrestling, and is the current Impact Digital Media Champion in his first reign.

Hendry is also known for his appearances in his native Scotland with Insane Championship Wrestling (ICW), where he was a one-time ICW Tag Team Champion, in England with New Generation Wrestling and Defiant Wrestling (formerly What Culture Pro Wrestling), and in the United States with Impact Wrestling.

A decorated amateur wrestler, Hendry has earned British Senior National Championships in freestyle and Greco-Roman wrestling. Hendry represented Great Britain internationally in freestyle wrestling at the Commonwealth Wrestling Championship in 2017, and subsequently earned a position on the freestyle wrestling team for Scotland at the 2018 Commonwealth Games.

Professional wrestling career

Training and early career
Hendry initially trained to become a professional wrestler with Damian Mackle, Mikey Whiplash, Robbie Brookside, and Marty Jones at the Source Wrestling School. In 2014, he made two appearances for WWE: as a Rosebud on the 19 May episode of Raw, and as a Russian diplomat on the 10 November episode of Raw. His first Canadian tour was with SMASH Wrestling. He has also worked for Pro Wrestling Ulster.

Insane Championship Wrestling (2013–2019)
In 2013, Hendry began regularly appearing for Insane Championship Wrestling (ICW), and was first introduced as a member of James R. Kennedy's stable, the Kennedy Administration. He entered into a rivalry with Big Damo, before feuding with fellow Kennedy Administration member Kenny Williams. Williams won the ICW Zero-G Championship during this time, and Hendry faced him several times for the title but was unable to win it. On April 6th, 2015, Hendry unsuccessfully challenged Drew Galloway for the ICW World Heavyweight Championship at Pro Wrestling Ulster event in which the EVOLVE and DGUSA Open the Freedom Gate titles were also on the line.

Hendry later formed tag team the Local Fire with Davey Boy. Together, they entered the ICW Tag Team Title Tournament (held to crown new champions once Polo Promotions left the company after winning the belts) and beat Mike Bird and Wild Boar in the finals at Shug's Hoose Party 3 on 31 July 2016 to win the vacant ICW Tag Team Championships. They lost the titles on 11 September 2016 to Polo Promotions in a ladder match.

On 27 July 2019, Hendry was forced to leave ICW after losing to Leyton Buzzard in a singles match at Night 1 of Shug's Hoose Party 6. This led to him signing with Ring of Honor just days later.

New Generation Wrestling (2015–2018)
Hendry made his debut for New Generation Wrestling (NGW) in 2015, losing a match to Nathan Cruz before forming Team Scotland with fellow ICW wrestlers Davey Blaze, Lionheart and Kid Fite. Team Scotland often antagonised NGW Champion Nathan Cruz and eventually challenged Cruz to face them in an eight-man tag team match with Cruz's title on the line with the stipulation that if Cruz or any of his teammates were pinned, he would lose the title. Cruz retained his title in the eight-man tag team match in November 2015. Hendry, Lionheart and Kid Fite next appeared for NGW in May 2016, all three answering the NGW Tag Team Championship Open Challenge set by The UK's Biggest Tag Team (Stixx and Colossus Kennedy). After Hendry used the belt as a weapon, the trio became the new tag team champions. The official name for the team was later confirmed to be Insane Fight Club.

What Culture Pro Wrestling / Defiant Wrestling (20162018)
Hendry then began working for What Culture Pro Wrestling (WCPW). The first few weeks Hendry started a feud with Joseph Conners when, on 3 September, at WCPW Stacked Hendry was involved in a fatal four way for the WCPW Championship, in which, he was betrayed by Conners, who won the title. He faced Conners two times for the WCPW Title, but was defeated twice. After two defeats by the then WCPW Champion Drew Galloway, Hendry turned heel. On 6 March, at Exit Wounds, Hendry, Joe Coffey, Travis Banks, and BT Gunn formed The Prestige, a stable claiming something was wrong with professional wrestling and they were going to fix it. At the Mexican qualifier for the WCPW Pro Wrestling World Cup, Hendry defeated Martin Kirby by referee stoppage, becoming the WCPW Champion. On 2 October 2017, at WCPW Refuse to Lose '17, Hendry defended his championship against Will Ospreay. During the match, Marty Scurll cashed in his 'Magnificent Seven' briefcase (which he won earlier in the night from Hendry's stablemate El Ligero) to make the match a triple threat. Scurll then won the championship by submitting Hendry with the crossface chickenwing. Hendry then started a feud with fellow stablemate Travis Banks, causing the exodus of Joe Coffey and BT Gunn from The Prestige.

World of Sport Wrestling (2018–2019)
Between 10 and 12 May 2018, Hendry was part of the television tapings for the reboot of World of Sport Wrestling. On the 28 July episode of WOS Wrestling (taped 10 May), Hendry partnered Martin Kirby in the WOS Tag Team Championship first match against Iestyn Rees and Kip Sabian. However, Kirby walked away from Hendry during the match, allowing him to be beaten down by Rees and Sabian. The two men traded wins over each other; Kirby on the 11 August episode (taped 10 May) in a singles match, and Hendry on the 1 September episode (taped 11 May) in a submission match.

Hendry was also involved in title challenges for the WOS Championship. On the 4 August episode (taped 10 May), he interrupted a segment with the then-current champion, Rampage. Executive Stu Bennett gave him a title shot soon afterwards, but Hendry was defeated by Rampage. On the 18 August episode (taped 11 May), he wrestled in a number one contender three-way match, alongside Justin Sysum and Nathan Cruz, which Sysum won.

From January to February 2019, Hendry was part of the World of Sport Wrestling UK tour, where he was largely used in tag matches. He was successful in all of them, teaming with BT Gunn four times and Grado once.

Impact Wrestling (2018)
On 25 May 2018, Impact Wrestling announced through Twitter that Hendry would be part of the 1 and 2 June television tapings for the promotion from Windsor, Ontario, Canada. Hendry made his debut for the company on the 5 July episode of Impact!, as a surprise to Grado by his girlfriend Katarina. On the 12 July episode, the trio got involved in a feud with Eli Drake, who insinuated to Grado that Hendry was trying to make Katarina his girlfriend. On the 17 July episode, Hendry defeated Drake in his first match for the company. On the 26 July episode, in a backstage segment, Drake gave the trio a gift which Grado unwrapped; it was a framed photograph of Hendry and Katarina together. Insulted by this action, Hendry and Katarina took the photograph away to dipose of it. On the 2 August episode, Hendry teamed with Grado in a tag team match with Drake, Trevor Lee and Caleb Konley. Lee and Konley took Hendry out of the match before the bell rung, which led to Grado being outnumbered and losing the match, and Hendry being tended to by Katarina on the outside, furthering the love triangle storyline. On the 9 August episode, in a backstage segment, the trio were arguing over the events of the previous week. Katarina questioned Grado over why he could not beat Drake on his own, because Hendry did, and Hendry told Grado that he would beat Drake again to end the feud. However, on the 16 August episode, Grado attempted to help Hendry as the referee was being distracted by Lee. Drake took control and pushed Hendry into Grado, knocking him off the apron and then winning the match with a roll up. On the 6 September episode, Hendry teamed with Grado in a tag team match against the Desi Hit Squad (Gursinder Singh and Rohit Raju), in a losing effort. Following the match, Katarina turned heel, berating Grado and splitting up with him, before proclaiming her love for Hendry. Katarina made out with Hendry, but Hendry rebuffed her, instead siding with Grado. Hendry then called her the embarrassment in the situation, not Grado, so Katarina slapped him and walked away. On the 27 September episode held in Mexico City, Mexico, Katarina approached Hendry and Grado in a backstage segment, and introduced Murder Clown to them, who would wrestle Hendry the following week. On the 4 October episode, Hendry was defeated by Murder Clown, which ended up being his final televised match for Impact Wrestling.

On 15 February 2019, Hendry thanked Impact Wrestling for giving him a platform to appear on their program, but announced that he was no longer signed to appear for the company.

Ring of Honor (2016, 2018, 2019–2022)
Prior to his signing in 2019, Hendry made a few appearances for American promotion Ring of Honor over the previous years. In November 2016, Hendry wrestled two matches on a Ring of Honor tour of the United Kingdom. He lost both matches, which were against Donovan Dijak and Jay White. On 25 May 2018, Hendry challenged Silas Young for the ROH World Television Championship, but was unsuccessful.

On 8 August 2019, it was announced that Hendry was a free agent no longer, and had now signed a contract with ROH.

Following Tony Khan's purchase of Ring of Honor, Hendry wrestled at Supercard of Honor XV, losing to Dalton Castle.

Return to Impact Wrestling (2022–present)
On 15 September 2022 episode of Impact!, a vignette aired that Hendry is coming to Impact Wrestling, with the company announcing on Twitter that he's signed with them. On 7 October, at Bound for Glory, he made his in-ring return by participating in the Call Your Shot Gauntlet, being eliminated by Moose.

On October 22, 2022 Hendry won the Impact Digital Media Championship by defeating Brian Myers on a early taping of Impact!.

Professional wrestling style and persona
Hendry was a musician for 10 years (he and his band were close to signing a deal with Sony Music), and has incorporated his prior career into his professional wrestling work. Hendry writes and performs his own entrance music and videos. As a face, Hendry was known for flamboyant ring entrances, usually parodying a famous song to mock his opponent. Examples of this include: Phil Collins' "In the Air Tonight" used during his feud with former manager James R. Kennedy, the EastEnders theme tune to mock Sha Samuels, and Limp Bizkit's "Rollin'" to mock Wolfgang. In Insane Championship Wrestling, he was known as the "Local Hero", referring to a section of Kerrang! named "Local Heroes" that Hendry had appeared in, as to make fun of his "lack of musical success".

Following a heel turn in March 2017, where Hendry was the leader of WCPW stable The Prestige, he became known as "The Prestigious One". Although the stable disbanded in early 2018, Hendry has continued to refer to himself by the moniker, stating that "it's me with the volume turned up", and also in a BBC interview when training for the 2018 Commonwealth Games.

Hendry was also formerly known as 'Stadium Joe' during his stint with ICW. A reflection on his in ring persona having a tendency to exaggerate the truth and fabricate  stories.

Amateur wrestling career
A black belt in Judo, Hendry transitioned to amateur freestyle wrestling in 2014 at the relatively late age of 26. Hendry would capture the British Senior National Championship in freestyle wrestling in 2017, and was subsequently selected for membership on Team Scotland at the 
2018 Commonwealth Games. Hendry went out of competition in the Round of 16, losing to Australia's Nicolaas Verreynne. Following the Commonwealth Games, Hendry would go on to win the British Senior National Championship in Greco-Roman wrestling in 2018.

Personal life
Hendry has a Master's degree in business and marketing. He is the nephew of politician Drew Hendry, the SNP MP for Inverness, Nairn, Badenoch and Strathspey, and a former Highland Council leader.

Championships and accomplishments

Amateur wrestling 
 British Wrestling
 2018 British Senior Championship Freestyle Bronze Medal
 2018 British Senior Championship Greco-Roman Gold Medal
 2018 English Senior Championship Freestyle Gold Medal
 2017 British Senior Championship Freestyle Gold Medal
 2017 British Closed Senior Championship Freestyle Silver Medal
 2017 Tryst Open Senior Freestyle Gold Medal
 2015 Scottish Open Senior Freestyle Silver Medal
 2015 Tryst Open Senior Freestyle Bronze Medal

Professional wrestling 
 British Wrestling Revolution
 BWR Heavyweight Championship (1 time)
 DDT Pro-Wrestling
 Ironman Heavymetalweight Championship (1 time)
 Discovery Wrestling
 Y Division Championship (1 time, current)
 Fight Forever Wrestling
 Fight Forever Men's World Championship (1 time, current)
 Impact Wrestling
 Impact Digital Media Championship (1 time, current)
 Insane Championship Wrestling
 ICW Tag Team Championship (1 time) – with Davey Boy
 ICW Tag Team Title Tournament (2016) – with Davey Boy
 New Generation Wrestling
 NGW Tag Team Championship (1 time) – with Kid Fite and Lionheart
 Pride Wrestling
 N7 Championship (1 time)
 Pro Wrestling Elite
 PWE Heavyweight Championship (1 time)
 Pro Wrestling Illustrated
 Ranked No. 321 of the top 500 singles wrestlers in the PWI 500 in 2019
 Pro Wrestling Ulster
 PWU All-Ulster Championship (2 times)
 Reckless Intent Wrestling
 Reckless Intent World Championship (1 time)
 Reckless Intent UK Championship (1 time)
 Respect Pro Wrestling
 Respect Pro Wrestling Championship (1 time)
 Ring of Honor
 ROH Year-End Award (1 time)
 Best Entrance (2020)
 Scottish Wrestling Alliance
 SWA Laird of the Ring Championship (1 time)
 Scottish Wrestling Entertainment
 SWE Heavyweight Championship (1 time)
 What Culture Pro Wrestling/Defiant Wrestling
 WCPW/ Defiant Championship (1 time)
 Defiant Internet Championship (1 time)
 Kurt Angle Invitational Rumble (2016)

References

External links

1988 births
Living people
Sportspeople from Edinburgh
Scottish male professional wrestlers
Scottish male wrestlers
Wrestlers at the 2018 Commonwealth Games
Commonwealth Games competitors for Scotland
British male sport wrestlers
21st-century professional wrestlers
Ironman Heavymetalweight Champions
Impact Digital Media Champions